Duchy of Głubczyce was one of the duchies of Silesia. Its capital was Głubczyce in Upper Silesia.

Bibliography
ŽÁČEK, Rudolf. Dějiny Slezska v datech. Praha : Libri, 2003. .

Duchies of Silesia
States and territories established in 1172
States and territories disestablished in 1503